The White Stag Block facility refers to the Bickel Block Building, the Skidmore Block Building, and the White Stag Building, in Portland, Oregon's Old Town Chinatown neighborhood, in the United States. It was purchased by the University of Oregon Foundation in 2015.

See also

 List of University of Oregon buildings
 The Duck Store
 University of Oregon College of Design
 White Stag sign

References

External links
 

Buildings and structures in Portland, Oregon
Northwest Portland, Oregon
Old Town Chinatown
University of Oregon